Lino Tempelmann (born 2 February 1999) is a German professional footballer who plays as a midfielder for 2. Bundesliga club 1. FC Nürnberg, on loan from  SC Freiburg.

Career
Tempelmann made his professional debut with SC Freiburg in a 2–1 Bundesliga win over RB Leipzig on 26 October 2019.

References

External links
 
 
 Bundesliga Profile

Living people
1999 births
Association football midfielders
Footballers from Munich
German footballers
Germany youth international footballers
TSV 1860 Munich players
SC Freiburg players
SC Freiburg II players
1. FC Nürnberg players
Bundesliga players
2. Bundesliga players
Regionalliga players